This is a list of flag bearers who have represented West Germany at the Olympics.

Flag bearers carry the national flag of their country at the opening ceremony of the Olympic Games.

See also
West Germany at the Olympics
List of flag bearers for Germany at the Olympics
List of flag bearers for East Germany at the Olympics

References

Flag
Germany
Olympic flagbearers
Olympic flagbearers